The Bangladesh Sericulture Research and Training Institute is an autonomous national research institute that carries out research on sericulture (silk farming) and supports the sericulture industry in Bangladesh.  The organization is located in the city of Rajshahi.

History
The institute traces its origins to the Silk Institute that was established in Rajshahi in 1898, during the colonial British Raj period.

During the post-colonial East Pakistan period (1955–1971) there were two institutes, the Silk Research Institute and Silk Technology Institute.

Following national independence, the institutes were merged to form Silk Research and Training Institute in 1974. Now renamed the Sericulture Research and Training Institute, it is under the Bangladesh Sericulture Board. The institute is the only one in Bangladesh specializing in silk research. It has developed a number of high yielding Mulberry plant cultivars and silkworms.

See also

References

Research institutes in Bangladesh
Sericulture
Textile industry of Bangladesh
Government agencies of Bangladesh
Organisations based in Rajshahi
Educational institutions established in 1898
Research institutes established in 1898
1898 establishments in British India
Government agencies established in 1974
1974 establishments in Bangladesh